Travis Demetrius Leslie (born March 29, 1990) is an American professional basketball player for Legia Warszawa of the Polish Basketball League. He is a 6'4", 205 lb shooting guard out of the University of Georgia.

High school
Leslie attended Columbia High School, in Decatur, Georgia, where he played basketball.

College career
Leslie played NCAA Division I college basketball at the University of Georgia, where he played with the Georgia Bulldogs, from 2008 to 2011.

Professional career

Los Angeles Clippers (2011–2012) 
Leslie was drafted by the Los Angeles Clippers in the second round of the 2011 NBA draft with the 47th pick. In March 2012, Leslie was assigned twice to the Bakersfield Jam, the Clippers' D-League affiliate. Leslie was waived by the Clippers on October 30, 2012.

Santa Cruz Warriors (2012–2013) 
On November 2, 2012, Leslie was selected by the Santa Cruz Warriors in the NBA D-League Draft.

On February 14, 2013, Leslie was named to the Prospects All-Star roster for the 2013 NBA D-League All-Star Game as a replacement for Andrew Goudelock. He was subsequently named the MVP of the D-League All-Star Game with 19 points, 7 rebounds and 1 assist as the Prospects went on to defeat the Futures 139–125.

On March 10, 2013, Leslie was signed to a 10-day contract by the Utah Jazz. He did not appear in a game for the Jazz during that time, and was not signed to a second 10-day contract. He returned to the Santa Cruz Warriors following his stint.

ASVEL Basket (2013–2014) 
In August 2013, Leslie joined JSF Nanterre of France. He left them before the start of the new season, and then signed with ASVEL Basket. ASVEL waived him on January 13, 2014.

BC Šiauliai (2014) 
In January 2014, Leslie signed with BC Šiauliai.

Lietuvos rytas (2014–2015) 
On July 23, 2014, Leslie signed a one-year deal with an option to another with Lietuvos rytas of Lithuania.

Medi Bayreuth (2015–2016) 
After his contract with Lietuvos rytas expired, Leslie signed on August 14, 2015, with Medi Bayreuth of the Basketball Bundesliga.

Fort Wayne Mad Ants (2016–2017) 
On October 30, 2016, Leslie was selected by the Fort Wayne Mad Ants with the fourth overall pick in the 2016 NBA Development League Draft.

Sydney Kings (2017) 
On August 10, 2017, Leslie signed with the Sydney Kings for the 2017–18 NBL season. On November 9, 2017, he was released by the Kings.

Levallois Metropolitans (2017–2018) 
On November 12, 2017, Leslie signed with French club Levallois Metropolitans for the rest of the season. He averaged 12.3 points per game with the team.

Boulazac Basket Dordogne (2018–2019) 
Leslie signed with Boulazac Basket Dordogne on October 8, 2018.

Élan Béarnais Pau-Lacq-Orthez 
On June 20, 2019, Leslie signed with Élan Béarnais Pau-Lacq-Orthez of the LNB Pro A.

Champagne Châlons-Reims Basket (2020–2021) 
On July 15, 2020, Leslie signed with Champagne Châlons-Reims in the Pro A.

Leones de Ponce (2021) 
On September 9, 2021, Leslie signed with Leones de Ponce in the Baloncesto Superior Nacional. He averaged 13.3 points, 6.6 rebounds, 3.4 assists, and 1.2 steals per game.

Real Betis Baloncesto (2021–2022) 
On December 20, 2021, Leslie signed with Real Betis Baloncesto of the Liga ACB.

Legia Warszawa (2022–present) 
On July 30, 2022, he has signed with Legia Warszawa of the Polish Basketball League.

NBA career statistics

Regular season

|-
| align="left" | 
| align="left" | L. A. Clippers
| 10 || 0 || 4.5 || .357 || .000 || .444 || .9 || .5 || .2 || .2 || 1.4
|- class="sortbottom"
| style="text-align:center;" colspan="2"| Career
| 10 || 0 || 4.5 || .357 || .000 || .444 || .9 || .5 || .2 || .2 || 1.4

References

External links

 Travis Leslie at nba.com
 Travis Leslie at georgiadogs.com
 "Sydney Kings sign high-flying former LA Clippers guard Travis Leslie for 2017-18 NBL campaign" at heraldsun.com.au

1990 births
Living people
American expatriate basketball people in Australia
American expatriate basketball people in France
American expatriate basketball people in Germany
American expatriate basketball people in Lithuania
American men's basketball players
ASVEL Basket players
Bakersfield Jam players
Basketball players from Atlanta
BC Rytas players
BC Šiauliai players
Élan Béarnais players
Fort Wayne Mad Ants players
Georgia Bulldogs basketball players
Legia Warsaw (basketball) players
Los Angeles Clippers draft picks
Los Angeles Clippers players
Medi Bayreuth players
Metropolitans 92 players
Santa Cruz Warriors players
Shooting guards
Sydney Kings players